Caroline Receveur Philip (born 10 November 1987) is a French fashion blogger, television presenter and actress. She first appeared as a contestant in reality programs and continues to appear in television programs and her fashion blog, as well as post on social media.

Education and early career 
Caroline Receveur was born in Épinal in the department of Vosges. She is the second child of Jacky Receveur, a former soccer player of the FC Metz in the 1970s. As a child, she dreamt of becoming a model and passed her first casting at the age of 14. She studied at the Claude Gellée High School in Épinal and after obtaining a baccalauréat littéraire at 17, she was allowed by her parents to leave the family household. She moved to Paris, where she signed a contract a few months later with the modeling agency Roxane. However, her shootings did not allow her to have a home in the capital.

She worked as a waitress in a nightclub in Metz while continuing to travel in Paris for modeling contracts. Her height did not allow her to pursue modelling vocationally.

Television career 
In June 2008, she participated at the second season of Secret Story broadcast on TF1. Her secret was that she and another contestant, Nicolas, were a couple. She was eliminated after two weeks, after having been nominated while revealing her secret. 

In 2010, she made her return on to reality television, participating at several programs broadcast on NRJ 12. She was featured on the fourth season of La Maison du bluff and the second season of Les Anges de la télé-réalité.

In 2012, she became one of the main actresses of the scripted reality Hollywood Girls. In 2013, she managed the second season of La Maison du bluff. She left Hollywood Girls in 2014 after three seasons. In January 2014, she started co-hosting Le Mag but left the program in September to focus on other personal projects.

In 2016, she was a contestant at the seventh season of Danse avec les stars where she had Maxime Dereymez as a coach and partner. She stated during her participation that she wanted to pay homage to her father who died a few months earlier. She was eliminated during the seventh episode on 26 November 2016.

Danse avec les stars

In 2016, she participated in the seventh season of Danse avec les stars – the French version of Dancing with the Stars. She was partnered with professional dancer Maxime Dereymez. On November 26, 2016, they were eliminated finishing 6th out of 11 contestants. 

In week 3, the public give a note to each couples.

Parallel activities 
She created Wandertea, a brand of detox products with tea and natural plants, in association with the pharmacist and herbalist Julien Duschene. She has also created and held a blog where she gives fashion advice. She continues to post on social media. 

In August 2015, she reached one million followers on Instagram and posted a picture of her wearing a bra.

Personal life 
Caroline Receveur is the second of three children. She has an older brother named Benjamin, born 31 December 1984, and a younger sister named Mathilde, born 3 February 1995. She has the birthdate of her parents and siblings tattooed inside her left arm.

In January 2012, she began a relationship with Valentin Lucas, whom she met while on the jury of Mister France in February 2011. In 2013, they publicly announced they were ready to have a child together and to get married, but later decided to wait. In January 2015, they left their apartment in Paris to move to London. In early November 2016, they ended their relationship.

In 2013, she announced her father had been a victim of a stroke several years prior. On 29 May 2016 she announced through social media that her father had died.

She has been dating French model Hugo Philip since December 2016. They have a son together named Marlon Philip Receveur, born 6 July 2018. They got married in July 2020 in Paris and moved to Dubai a few weeks later.

Television programs 
Television presenter
La Maison du Bluff (2012–14) on NRJ 12
Le Mag (2014) on NRJ 12

Television actress
Hollywood Girls (2012–14) as Caroline Valès

Contestant
Secret Story 2 (2008) on TF1
La Maison du Bluff (2011) on NRJ 12
Les Anges de la télé-réalité (2011) on NRJ 12
Danse avec les stars, seventh season (2016) on TF1

References

External links 
Official website

1987 births
French television presenters
French women television presenters
French bloggers
French women bloggers
People from Épinal
Living people
French expatriates in England